The Western Correctional Institution is a maximum security state prison for men located in Cumberland, Allegany County, Maryland.  It opened in 1996 and has an official capacity of 1793.

Western Correctional Institution is close to two other correctional facilities:  the high-tech "hyper max" North Branch Correctional Institution first opened as an extension of Western which, later was officially separated in 2003, and the Allegany County Detention Center. A third prison, the Federal Correctional Institution, Cumberland, is located in the same county.

Notable inmates

Current
 Nicholas Waggoner Browning – murdered his parents and two younger brothers in 2008.
 James Allen Kulbicki – Baltimore City police officer found guilty of murdering his mistress. Story turned into the 1996 TV movie "Double Jeopardy".
 Michael Thompson, another Baltimore police officer found guilty of murder. He could have got the death penalty but is facing life in jail.

Former
 Joe Metheny – serial killer – died of natural causes in 2017 at Western Correctional Institution.

References

1996 establishments in Maryland
Buildings and structures in Allegany County, Maryland
Cumberland, Maryland
Prisons in Maryland